Switzerland made its Paralympic Games début at the inaugural Paralympic Games in Rome in 1960 (sending just two athletes, who nonetheless won four medals), and has participated in every edition of the Summer Paralympics. It also took part in the inaugural Winter Paralympics in 1976 in Örnsköldsvik, and has competed in every edition of the Winter Games.

Swiss athletes have won a total of 380 Paralympic medals, of which 117 gold, 133 silver and 130 bronze, placing the country 17th on the all-time Paralympic Games medal table. The country has won 228 medals at the Summer Games, and 152 at the Winter Games.

Switzerland's best result at the Summer Games came in 1984, when its athletes won 43 medals, of which 18 gold. Its worst result in terms of medal haul came in 1964, with just one silver medal, but it had sent a delegation of just one athlete (archer Caroline Troxler-Kung). Its highest ranking was 13th, in 1960; its lowest was 40th, in 2004. The country placed 2nd on the medal chart at the inaugural Winter Games in 1976, its best result, winning 10 gold medals. Swiss athletes also won 10 gold medals in 1998, but their highest medal haul over all came in 1988, when they took 37 medals (of which 5 gold). The country's poorest result was in 2006, when for the first time the Swiss failed to win a gold medal, and finished 13th on the medal chart, with one silver and a bronze.

Switzerland's most successful athlete, and one of the most successful Paralympians of all times, is wheelchair athlete Heinz Frei, who since his début in 1984 has won fifteen gold medals, eight silver, and twelve bronze, in track events, road cycling, and cross-country skiing. He has, in particular, won the Paralympic marathon for his disability category on two occasions, in 1984 and in 1992. In addition, wheelchair athlete Franz Nietlispach, over the course of his career from 1976 to 2004, won fourteen gold medals, six silver and one bronze in track events, from sprinting to long distance running, as well as a bronze medal in road cycling. At the 1984 Games, he managed a virtually clean sweep of the six individual racing events he entered, winning gold in five, but taking "only" silver in the 100 metres, where he was beaten by D. Barret (full name not recorded) of the United States. At the 1988 Games, Nietlispach won six gold medals in individual races, including the 5,000 metres (though he was again beaten in the 100 metres). Rolf Heinzmann, for his part, won twelve gold medals and two silver in alpine skiing between 1980 and 2002, including a clean sweep of the downhill, slalom, giant slalom and Super-G in 1998.

Medals by Summer Games

Winter Paralympics

See also
 Switzerland at the Olympics

References